Stuart Robbins (2 November 1976 – 12 April 2010) was a Welsh basketball player from Neath in South Wales, who played at centre for the London Towers and Thames Valley in the British Basketball League and professionally in Germany, Belgium and in Limerick, Ireland. He had also played college basketball at Saint Joseph's University in Pennsylvania, United States. In Limerick, he served as assistant coach as well as centre for the city's Superleague team UL Eagles. UL Eagles point guard Matt Hall, also Welsh, was a close friend.

Death
Stuart Robbins died in his sleep at the age of 33; he was found dead in his hotel room in Galway on 12 April 2010. He had just completed his debut season with UL Eagles, where he led his team in scoring and rebounding and was considered one of the outstanding players of that season.

References

1976 births
2010 deaths
Welsh men's basketball players
Welsh expatriate sportspeople in Belgium
Welsh expatriate sportspeople in Germany
Welsh expatriate sportspeople in Ireland
Welsh expatriate sportspeople in the United States
Centers (basketball)
Bree BBC players
British expatriate basketball people in Germany
British expatriate basketball people in the United States
London Towers players
Sportspeople from Neath
Saint Joseph's Hawks men's basketball players
FC Bayern Munich basketball players
British expatriate basketball people in Belgium
British expatriate basketball people in Ireland